Corporate services or business services are activities which combine or consolidate certain enterprise-wide needed support services, provided based on specialized knowledge, best practices, and technology to serve internal (and sometimes external) customers and business partners. The term corporate services providers (CSPs) is also used.

In the United Kingdom, the public audit agencies produced a report in May 2007 called "Value for Money in public sector corporate services". This provides performance indicators in five categories: Finance, Human Resources, Information & Communication Technology, Procurement, and Estates Management.

Examples of corporate services

Business advisory service

Business advisory service advises current and future businesses prospects of a client, with the aim of advancing their business or company. This service is used by all types of businesses and would involve examining the legal, tax, finance, market and risks factors involved to start up a business or making new changes to the business. Business advisory services are given by organisations with experience in company formation.

Company incorporation

Company incorporation is the process of forming a company corporation officially in the country of residence. It is also possible non-residents to set up a company: see offshore company. However, laws vary in all countries. International corporate service consultants specialise in dealing with incorporation in the country in question.  Once application is successful, the company will receive a certificate of incorporation. Which provides valid existence of the company under the registered name given.

Registered agent

A registered agent, also known as a resident agent or statutory agent, is a business or individual designated to receive service of process (SOP) when a business entity is a party in a legal action such as a lawsuit or summons. Some examples of related services include:

 Compliance services
 Business licensing
 DBA Doing Business As filings.
 Preparation and filing of reports that must be filed from time to time (Annual, Biennial, etc.)

Finance and banking

Corporate services such as finance and banking were first introduced to remove pressure from the client's organisation when dealing with complex banking and finance issues. Specialist information and tips are provided by the consultancy to manage finances appropriately, and some can set up a corporate bank account for clients. Some examples of tailored services include:

 Corporate bank accounts
 Offshore bank accounts
 Multi-currency accounts
 Brokerage accounts
 Private banking
 Corporate loan applications

Accounting and tax services
Accounting and tax services are useful for companies wanting to outsource their basic work. The services involve preparing and submitting obligatory documents required by authorities associated with business practice. Some basic services include:

 Payroll
 Maintaining cash flow books
 Tax registration
 Tax returns
 Corporation tax
 Tax avoidance (international)

Investment and stock exchange

Market research for investment along with risk evaluation is another corporate service designed to help clients make financial decisions. Intellectual property protection is seen as an investment, this is a service some consultancies may also advise on. Similarly, stock exchange services can bring about specialist reports on past, current and forecasted stock exchange trends, with a personalised analysis.

Offshore bundled services
Where local Corporate Service Providers (CSPs) offer bundled basic services to support tax residency tests such as "central management and control" type tests (typical in UK law) of a brass plate company, shell company or other special-purpose vehicle that has been set up in the jurisdiction. Usually located in either offshore financial centres or in onshore financial centres. Typical services include:

 Maintain books and records
 Compiling annual accounts
 Conducting annual audits
 Filing tax returns
 Providing local Directors
 Providing registered office address
 Providing meeting rooms for Board meetings

Legal aspects

In ordinary circumstances, corporate service providers may not, or alternatively will not, act as a trustee for the clients which they provide services to. This is to maintain the integrity of the client organization and its ability to represent itself in legal processes. It also avoids excessive risk on behalf of the purveyor of corporate services.

This practice seeks to ensure that the corporate personhood of the client is secured. Exceptions to this may be in litigations or corporate bankruptcy filings where the enterprise entity of the client is considered legally incapacitated and is therefor incapable of representing itself in a court process. In these rare cases the corporate service provider may decide to act as a trustee for the client.

See also
Financial adviser

References

Service industries